Vaanmathi is a 1996 Indian Tamil-language romantic drama film directed by Agathiyan starring Ajith Kumar and Swathi. This film portrays hatred that slowly transforms to love between two young people who are from very different financial backgrounds. The film was released on 12 January 1996 and went on to become a commercial success, running for 175 days at the box office.

Plot 
Krishna (Ajith) belongs to a middle-class family, where his father is a womaniser and brought up Krishna as a good for nothing fellow. Krishna is also an youngster who likes to waste time, by hanging out with his friends and roaming behind girls. Vaanmathi (Swathi) is the daughter of a rich business woman who is very arrogant and does anything for money. For example, she even abandoned her husband when Vaanmathi was a baby for money. Vaanmathi is a girl who grew up to be a bully, by bringing a bunch of friends in her vehicle and making fun of every guy they come across. Krishna and Vaanmathi play tricks on each other and fight after they met but eventually fall in love, but Vaanmathi's mother is not happy with that. She dislikes Krishna and considers him as her enemy #1.

She tries everything to break them. Finally she arranges a marriage between Vaanmathi and son of the Governor of Tamil Nadu. Whether Vanmathi and Krishna's love wins over the arrogant mother forms the story.

Cast

Production 
Vaanmathi is the first film produced by film producer Sivasakthi Pandian. He financed the film from the profits he made from distributing Muthu (1995).

Soundtrack 
The music was composed by Deva.

Release 
The film became a success and subsequently set up a future collaboration between the director and actor in Kadhal Kottai.

References

External links 
 

1990s Tamil-language films
1996 films
Films directed by Agathiyan
Films scored by Deva (composer)
Films set in Chennai
Films shot in Ooty